William Henry Whiting Jr. (July 24, 1862 – March 28, 1949) was the acting president of Hampden–Sydney College from 1904 to 1905 and again from 1908 to 1909.

Biography
Whiting was born in Clarke County, Virginia to William H. and Mary Jay (née Foote) Whiting in Millwood, Virginia. He was the valedictorian of his 1880 graduating class from Hampden–Sydney College, where he also earned his master's degree in 1882. He was an assistant at Prince Edward Academy in Worsham, Virginia from 1881 to 1886 and in 1888 he founded Clay Hill Academy in his hometown of Millwood — where he would stay for the next fourteen years.

Whiting was hired as a professor of Latin at Hampden–Sydney in 1902 and served in that role until his retirement in 1939.

References

1862 births
1949 deaths
Hampden–Sydney College alumni
Presidents of Hampden–Sydney College
People from Millwood, Virginia
Hampden–Sydney College faculty